Monaco competed at the 1972 Summer Olympics in Munich, West Germany. Five competitors, all men, took part in four events in two sports.

Fencing

One fencer represented Monaco in 1972

Men's épée
 Jean-Charles Seneca - Eliminating rounds (2V-5L), did not advance

Shooting

Four shooters represented Monaco in 1972.

50 m rifle, three positions
 Francis Boisson - 1004, 67th place

50 m rifle, prone
 Joe Barral - 593 pts, 31st place
 Pierre Boisson - 585 pts, 73rd place

Trap
 Paul Cerutti - 171pts, 45th place (disqualified)

References

Nations at the 1972 Summer Olympics
1972 Summer Olympics
1972 in Monégasque sport